The Canton of Arras-Nord is a former canton situated in the department of the Pas-de-Calais and in the Nord-Pas-de-Calais region of northern France. It was disbanded following the French canton reorganisation which came into effect in March 2015. It consisted of 4 communes, which joined the canton of Arras-2 in 2015. It had a total of 20,334 inhabitants (2012, without double counting).

Composition
The canton comprised 4 communes:
Arras (partly)
Athies
Saint-Laurent-Blangy
Saint-Nicolas

See also
Cantons of Pas-de-Calais 
Communes of Pas-de-Calais 
Arrondissements of the Pas-de-Calais department

References

Arras-Nord
Arras
2015 disestablishments in France
States and territories disestablished in 2015